The Eduserv Foundation was a United Kingdom nonprofit educational charity that worked to realise the benefits of Information and Communications Technology (ICT) for learners, researchers and the institutions that serve them.

The Foundation operated between July 2003 until 2008, during which period it launched a number of programmes of activity including: Eduserv Research Grants; Assistive Technology Licences; Tutor Guides for Vocational Education; and Information Literacy initiatives.

The Foundation primarily funded work in the areas of:

 repositories, metadata and open access;
 access and identity management;
 service architectures;
 effective elearning.

The Foundation was part of Eduserv, which is based in Bath, UK, and which continues to carry out research and innovation projects that build on the Foundation's work and maintains CHEST agreements for software procurement.

References

External links
 Eduserv Research and Innovation page
 eFoundations blog

2003 establishments in England
2008 disestablishments in England
Educational charities based in the United Kingdom
Information technology organisations based in the United Kingdom
Organisations based in Bath, Somerset
Organizations established in 2003
Organizations disestablished in 2008
Science and technology in Somerset